The Greece men's national under-26 basketball team is the Under-26 age men's national basketball team for Greece. It is not to be confused with the first-tier Greece men's national basketball team. The Greece men's Under-26 national team has been used to represent Greece at the Mediterranean Games.

History
The Greece men's under-26 national team has won the following medals at the Mediterranean games Basketball Tournament: the bronze medal at the 1987 Mediterranean Games, and silver medals at the 1991 Mediterranean Games, the 2001 Mediterranean Games, the 2005 Mediterranean Games, and the 2009 Mediterranean Games.

Mediterranean Games

External links
Hellenic Basketball Federation Official Website 

Under-26 Basketball Team